Rufinus may refer to:

Saints Rufinus, eleven saints named Rufinus in Roman Martyrology
Rufinus of Assisi, 3rd-century saint and martyr
Valerius and Rufinus (d. 287), Christian martyrs
Rufinus (Roman governor), 3rd century governor of Roman Britain
Rufinus (consul) (c. 335–395), Eastern Roman statesman
Tyrannius Rufinus, or Rufinus of Aquileia (c. 340–410), Roman monk, historian, and translator
Rufinus (relative of Theodosius II), 5th century
Rufinus (poet) of the Greek Anthology
Rufinus (decretist), 12th-century canon lawyer
Rufinus Widl (1731–1798), Benedictine monk
Rufinus (Roman official) 5th-6th-centuries Byzantine military officer and emissary

See also 
 Rufino (disambiguation)